Non-flammable alcohol vapor in carbon dioxide systems (NAV- system) were developed in Japan in the 1990s to sanitize hospitals and ambulances.

Application
The NAV- uses CO2 (carbon dioxide) as a propellant to dispense a 58% isopropyl alcohol solution in a heated stream. The procedure uses alcohol in an atomized vapor, and reaches nooks, crannies, and crevices that may be beyond the reach of other disinfecting methods.

Safety
The use of carbon dioxide as a propellant serves to displace ambient oxygen (one of the elements needed to support combustion) and eliminates the risk of explosion. The carbon dioxide and atomized alcohol evaporate at room temperature leaving no residue.

References and notes

Cleaning tools
Disinfectants